The 1981 NCAA Men's Division I Swimming and Diving Championships were contested in March 1981 at the Texas Swimming Center at the University of Texas at Austin in Austin, Texas at the 58th annual NCAA-sanctioned swim meet to determine the team and individual national champions of Division I men's collegiate swimming and diving in the United States. 

Hosts Texas topped the team standings for the first time, the Longhorns' inaugural national title. 

This was the final year before the inaugural NCAA Women's Division I Swimming and Diving Championships, although the men's and women's titles would not be held at the same site until 2006.

Team standings
Note: Top 10 only
(H) = Hosts
(DC) = Defending champions
Full results

See also
List of college swimming and diving teams

References

NCAA Division I Men's Swimming and Diving Championships
NCAA Division I Swimming And Diving Championships
NCAA Division I Swimming And Diving Championships
NCAA Division I Swimming And Diving Championships